Eliyahu Bet-Zuri (     10 February 1922 – 22 March 1945) was a member of Lehi, who was executed in Egypt for his part in the assassination of Lord Moyne, the British Minister Resident in the Middle East.

Biography

Bet-Zuri was born in Tel Aviv to Esther and Moshe Bet-Zuri. He was from a Mizrahi-Jewish family that had lived in Palestine for many generations. He had five siblings. His father was the Postmaster of Tiberias, a predominantly Jewish city with a significant Arab population, and was fluent in Arabic besides Hebrew. As a child, he served as a runner for a Haganah detachment, carrying ammunition, messages, and rations between Haganah posts. Through his friend Uzzi Ornan, Bet-Zuri knew Uzzi's brother, the poet Yonatan Ratosh, and was influenced by his opinions. Bet Zuri attended the Hebrew University of Jerusalem. He also joined the Irgun, but later left that movement to join the Lehi.

In 1944, Bet Zuri suggested assassinating British Prime Minister Winston Churchill and other highly placed British political personalities, according to secret files not publicly released by MI5 until April 2011.

Bet-Zuri pressed his commanders to be sent on a planned mission to assassinate Lord Moyne in Cairo. Although he lacked operational experience, it was judged that his dedication and determination would compensate for it. He was sent to Cairo along with Eliyahu Hakim to carry out the assassination.

On 6 November 1944, Bet Zuri and Hakim carried out their plan. While Hakim fatally shot Moyne, Bet-Zuri shot and killed his army driver, Lance Corporal A.T. Fuller. They were caught trying to escape on bicycles and put on trial before a military court. At the trial, Bet-Zuri gave a decidedly nationalist speech, inspired by the Canaanite movement in Palestine:
"We do not recognize England's right to give us Palestine or take it away from us.  Let me make clear to the court: My ideas are not Zionist ideas.  We don't fight to uphold the Balfour Declaration.  We don't fight for the sake of the National Home.  We fight for our freedom.  In our country a foreign power rules."
"Millions sank in the sea of blood and tears, but the British skipper did not lift them to the ship. And if a few of the survivors held on to the bow of the ship, he, the British skipper, pushed them back into the sea. And we in our homeland had no choice but to surrender or fight. We decided to fight.

He and Hakim were both sentenced to death. They were hanged in Cairo on 22 March 1945, singing Hatikvah, the song which would become the Israeli anthem, from the gallows.

Twenty-seven years later, Yitzhak Shamir, who had as their Lehi commander despatched them on their mission, lobbied Yitzhak Rabin's Labour Government to obtain their bodies as part of an exchange of prisoners between Egypt and Israel after the Yom Kippur War. On 25 June 1975, Egypt duly gave their remains to Israel in exchange for 20-25 Arab prisoners of war held in Israel.  They were interred on Mount Herzl with full military honours. The Ministry of Education supplied all Israeli schools with brochures explaining their acts and motives.

See also
Eliyahu Hakim
Olei Hagardom

References

External links

Malkah Ben Tov, "From Accused to Accusers: The Trial of Eliyahu Hakim and Eliyahu Bet-Zuri" on the Lehi website (Hebrew)
Dr. Yosef Nedava, "Hakim and Bet-Zuri," on the Daat website (Hebrew)
Eliyahu Bet-Zuri biography on the Etzel website

1922 births
1945 deaths
1945 murders in Egypt
People from Tel Aviv
Irgun members
Jewish Egyptian history
Sephardi Jews in Mandatory Palestine
Lehi (militant group)
Mizrahi Jews
Olei Hagardom
Canaanites (movement)
People executed for murder
People executed by Egypt by hanging
Burials at Mount Herzl
20th-century executions by Egypt
Executed assassins